Rimrock Lake is a lake along the course of the Tieton River, in Yakima County, Washington state, US.

The lake is used as a storage reservoir for the Yakima Project, an irrigation project run by the United States Bureau of Reclamation. An impoundment of the Tieton River, Rimrock Lake's capacity and discharge is controlled by Tieton Dam, a 319-foot (97 m) high structure built in 1925.

Upstream from the lake, the Tieton River is impounded by Clear Creek Dam, another element of the Yakima Project. The canal supplies irrigation water to the Tieton Division of the Yakima Project, with excess and agricultural runoff draining into Ahtanum Creek, west of Yakima.

Near the lakes are the communities of Rimrock and Silver Beach.

References

External links
 
 

Reservoirs in Washington (state)
Lakes of Yakima County, Washington
Protected areas of Yakima County, Washington
Mount Baker-Snoqualmie National Forest
Tributaries of the Yakima River